The Minnesota Department of Corrections is a state law enforcement agency of Minnesota that operates prisons. Its headquarters is in St. Paul.

As of 2010, the state of Minnesota does not contract with private prisons.  The first and only private prison in the state, the Prairie Correctional Facility, was closed by its owner in 2010.

The head of the agency is referred to as the Commissioner. , the holder of this office is Paul Schnell.

Adult and juvenile correctional facilities

Juvenile services
The department operates juvenile correctional facilities.

Minnesota Correctional Facility – Red Wing in Red Wing serves delinquent boys. It was built in 1889. Minnesota Correctional Facility – Togo in northern Itasca County no longer serves delinquent boys and girls. The Togo facility opened in 1955 as Youth Conservation Commission (YCC). For years it was known as Thistledew Camp. In 2006 the facility's name changed to MCF-Togo, and the Thistledew designation is used to refer to the juvenile programs. Now MCF-TOGO only serves adult males as a CIP program

See also

 List of law enforcement agencies in Minnesota
 List of United States state correction agencies
 List of U.S. state prisons

References

External links
 Minnesota Department of Corrections

 
State law enforcement agencies of Minnesota
Lists of United States state prisons
State agencies of Minnesota
State corrections departments of the United States
Juvenile detention centers in the United States